ASAP usually stands for "as soon as possible".

ASAP may also refer to:

Arts and media

Music

Performers
 ASAP (band), a hard rock band fronted by Adrian Smith
 ASAP Ferg (born 1988), American hip hop recording artist from Harlem, New York
 ASAP Mob, a recording group from Harlem, New York
 ASAP Rocky (born 1988), rapper from Harlem, New York

Recordings
 "ASAP" (Bardot song), 2001
 "ASAP" (STAYC song), 2021
 "ASAP" (T.I. song), 2005
 "ASAP", a song from the Lena Meyer-Landrut album Stardust
 "A.S.A.P.", a song by Hikaru Utada, 2002
 "A.S.A.P.", a song from the Two Steps from Hell album Legend
 "Get Back (ASAP)", a 2011 song by Alexandra Stan

Other media
 ASAP (Philippine TV program), a Philippine television variety show (All-Star Sunday Afternoon Party) which has aired on ABS-CBN since 1995
 Asap (web portal), an Associated Press multimedia news portal

Businesses and organizations
 Academics Stand Against Poverty, an international anti-poverty organization
 Aircraft Sales and Parts, an American kit aircraft and parts manufacturer
 Applied Security Analysis Program, an investment education program at the University of Wisconsin–Madison School of Business
 Aerospace Safety Advisory Panel, an independent NASA safety panel
 ASAP, Inc., a southern U.S.-based food delivery company

Science and technology
 AcceleratedSAP software, from SAP AG
 Another Slight Atari Player, an open-source player of Atari SAP music format
 Asynchronous array of simple processors, AsAP processor architecture
 Atypical small acinar proliferation, a diagnosis on prostate biopsy that carries an increased risk of finding prostate cancer on re-biopsy

See also 
STAT